Peramangk language is also known as Merildekald and is a Pama-Nyungan language of the Peramangk lands in South Australia. Like its congener the Kaurna language, it was previously considered endangered.

History 
Many Peramangk place names, cultural practices and dreamtime character names are well known. A proportion of the vocabulary and grammatical elements of the language may potentially be shared with Kaurna language as well as Nganguruku language, and to some extent the Ngarrindjeri and Ngadjuri languages among others. Some elements of the Peramangk language may be considered distinctive from Kaurna. Peramangk language may be held dear by Peramangk elders, and hence it was cited that a Peramangk descendant is collecting and compiling language data. It is likely that Peramangk elders knew each of the surrounding languages, as surrounding tribes often met on Peramangk land at their invitation.

A work compiled by The Lutheran Missionary Society within a short period after colonisation of mainland South Australia constitutes a reference manual for the Kaurna language and hence also for the Peramangk language, and the content of an available downloadable version is entirely searchable by text so serving as a handy resource for all ages.

References

Lower Murray languages
Thura-Yura languages